This article lists events that occurred during 1953 in Estonia.

Incumbents

Events
Guerrilla warfare (Forest Brothers) was practically reduced (was widespread since in 1945).

Births

Deaths

References

 
1950s in Estonia
Estonia
Estonia
Years of the 20th century in Estonia